The 2020 Thai League 3 lower region is a region in the regional stage of the 2020 Thai League 3. A total of twelve teams will compete in the league of the lower region.

Changes from prior season

Team changes

Promoted clubs

Two clubs were promoted from the 2020 Thai League 2
Nakhon Pathom United
Ranong United

Two clubs were promoted from the 2019 Thai League 4
Pattani
Pathumthani University

Relegated clubs

A club was relegated to the 2020 Thai League 4 Bangkok Metropolitan Region
Royal Thai Army
A club was relegated to the 2020 Thai League 4 Southern Region
Surat Thani

Renamed clubs

 Banbueng Phuket City was renamed to Banbueng

Teams

Stadium and locations

Foreign Players

League table

Standings

Positions by round

Results by round

Results

Season statistics

Top scorers
As of 1 March 2020.

Hat-tricks

Attendance

Overall statistics

Attendance by home match played

Source: Thai League 3

References

External links
Thai League official website

Thai League 3
2020 in Thai football leagues